In recipes, quantities of ingredients may be specified by mass (commonly called weight), by volume, or by count.

For most of history, most cookbooks did not specify quantities precisely, instead talking of "a nice leg of spring lamb", a "cupful" of lentils, a piece of butter "the size of a small apricot", and "sufficient" salt. Informal measurements such as a "pinch", a "drop", or a "hint" (soupçon) continue to be used from time to time. In the US, Fannie Farmer introduced the more exact specification of quantities by volume in her 1896 Boston Cooking-School Cook Book.

Today, most of the world prefers metric measurement by weight, though the preference for volume measurements continues among home cooks in the United States ("almost exclusively"), and the rest of North America. Different ingredients are measured in different ways:

Liquid ingredients are generally measured by volume worldwide.

Dry bulk ingredients, such as sugar and flour, are measured by weight in most of the world ("250 g flour"), and by volume in North America (" cup flour"). Small quantities of salt and spices are generally measured by volume worldwide, as few households have sufficiently precise balances to measure by weight.

In most countries, meat is described by weight or count: "a 2 kilogram chicken"; "four lamb chops".

Eggs are usually specified by count. Vegetables are usually specified by weight or occasionally by count, despite the inherent imprecision of counts given the variability in the size of vegetables.

Metric measures
In most of the world, recipes use the metric system of units—litres (L) and millilitres (mL), grams (g) and kilograms (kg), and degrees Celsius (°C). The official spelling litre is used in most English-speaking nations; the notable exception is the United States where the spelling liter is preferred.

The United States measures weight in pounds (avoirdupois), while recipes in the UK tend to include both imperial and metric measures, following the advice of the Guild of Food Writers. The United States also uses volume measures based on cooking utensils and pre-metric measures. The actual values frequently deviate from the utensils on which they were based, and there is little consistency from one country to another.

 In South Australia, a "pint" of beer is traditionally 425 mL, while most other states have metricated this value to 570 mL.

‡ In Canada, a cup was historically 8 imperial fluid ounces (227 mL) but could also refer to 10 imperial fl oz (284 mL), like in Britain, and even a metric cup of 250 mL. Serving sizes on nutrition labelling on food packages in Canada employ the metric cup of 250 mL, with nutrition labelling in the US using a cup of 240 mL, based on the US customary cup.

In the UK, teaspoons and tablespoons are formally 1/96 and 1/32 of an imperial pint (5.92 mL and 17.76 mL), respectively. In Canada, a teaspoon is historically 1/6 imperial fluid ounce (4.74 mL) and a tablespoon is ½ imperial fl oz (14.21 mL). In both Britain and Canada, cooking utensils come in 5 mL for teaspoons and 15 mL for tablespoons, hence why it is labelled as that on the chart.

The volumetric measures here are for comparison only. See below for the definition of Gallon for more details.

In Australia, since 1970, metric utensil units have been standardized by law and imperial measures no longer have legal status. However, it is wise to measure the actual volume of the utensil measures, particularly the 'Australian tablespoon' (see above), since many are imported from other countries with different values. Dessertspoons are standardized as part of the metric system at 10 mL, though they are not normally used in contemporary recipes. Australia is the only metricated country with a metric tablespoon of 20 mL, unlike other countries that metricated, which have a 15 mL metric tablespoon.

In Europe, older recipes frequently refer to pounds (e.g. Pfund in German, pond in Dutch, livre in French). In each case, the unit refers to 500 g, about 10% more than an avoirdupois pound (454 g). Dutch recipes may also use the ons, which is 100 g.

Weight of liquids
With the advent of accurate electronic scales, it has become more common to weigh liquids for use in recipes, avoiding the need for accurate volumetric utensils. The most common liquids used in cooking are water and milk, milk having approximately the same density as water.

1 mL of water weighs 1 gram so a recipe calling for 300 mL (≈  Imperial Pint) of water can simply be substituted with 300 g (≈ 10 oz.) of water.

1 fluid ounce of water weighs approximately 1 ounce so a recipe calling for a UK pint (20 fl oz) of water can be substituted with 20 oz of water.

More accurate measurements become important in the large volumes used in commercial food production. Also, a home cook can use greater precision at times. Water at  may be volumetrically measured then weighed to determine an unknown measuring-utensil volume without the need for a water-density adjustment.

United States measures 
The US uses pounds and ounces (avoirdupois) for weight, and US customary units for volume. For measures used in cookbooks published in other nations navigate to the appropriate regional section in Traditional measurement systems.

Measures are classified as either dry measures or fluid measures. Some of the fluid and dry measures have similar names, but the actual measured volume is quite different. A recipe will generally specify which measurement is required. U.S. recipes are commonly in terms of fluid measures, even for dry ingredients. Most of these units derive from earlier English units, as applied to the U.S. gallon. Typically they follow a pattern of binary submultiples, where each larger measure consists of two units of the next-smallest measure. An exception is with the commonly used teaspoon as one-third of a tablespoon.

Binary submultiples are fractional parts obtained by successively dividing by the number 2. Thus, one-half, one-fourth, one-eighth, one-sixteenth, and so on, are binary submultiples.

From units and tools of convenience, most of the system's history could have values vary widely, and was not until recent centuries that standardization began to take shape. Moreso, the overlap with other systems - like the apothecaries' system, and giving each  division a unique — and often variable by context, person, place, and time — name instead of a systematic one, can make the system seem confusing for those not accustomed to it. However, other than the unique names themselves, the regular ratios make the actual measurements strait forward; and in many cases names have been depreciated in favor of fractionally denominated amounts of a few core units (such as taking gallons, cups, and teaspoons to their nearest quarters without names: nixing pottle; gill and wineglass; dram (as a culinary unit), coffeespoon, and saltspoon; respectively), or are limited to the specific or esoteric.  

It is still a legal basis for measures in many states, such as Massachusetts, which mandates that "Glass bottles or jars used for the sale of milk or cream to the consumer shall be of the capacity of one gallon, a multiple of the gallon, or a binary submultiple of the gallon."

Metric equivalents are based upon one of two nearly equivalent systems. In the standard system the conversion is that 1 gallon = 231 cubic inches and 1 inch = 2.54 cm, which makes a gallon = 3785.411784 millilitres exactly. For nutritional labeling on food packages in the US, the teaspoon is defined as exactly 5 ml, giving 1 gallon = 3840 ml exactly. This chart uses the former.

Suffixed asterisks on some of the "tsp" units in the "Defined" column above indicate that those teaspoon units are defined as  fl oz (4 fl dram), the old 4 tsp = 1 tbsp amount, instead of  fl oz. This definition fits with "barkeepers' teaspoon", and is used in many cocktail recipe books; generally the subdivisions are not so explicitly defined nor named below  tsp in general culinary. This can be verified by comparing the associated values in the "fl oz" column.  All other "tsp" units in the "Defined" column are indeed defined as  fl oz, the current 3 tsp = 1 tbsp amount.

* Discrepancies due to size, generally disregarded as at the scale it becomes a factor, the person generally is using the next size up measuring cup (i.e.: 11⁄2 fl oz is likely to be straight measured in an ounce cup and not as 9 (vs 12) teaspoons) 
‡ Rare if not nonexistent in use by name rather than as fraction of a different unit.

† The fluid scruple has been properly defined on its own in the apothecaries' system as  fl oz,  fluid dram, or = 20 minims (≈ 1.23223 ml), and also  tsp. Mind that scruples and drams were pharmaceutical and intended to be specific and precise, whereas cooking measures tended to use what was on hand and/or actually used to consume what was being prepared, and not intended to be as formally scientific in its degree of precision.
The saltspoon most likely combined into the scruple over time, as a consequence of home cooks approximating standard measures with what they had at hand, much as the teaspoon was roughly "close enough" for a kitchen approximation to a fluid dram (= 60 minims), but not equal to the  fl dr (80 minims) value it actually is; especially with the variability of the method of measuring itself. Not of insignificance is the natural habit of customary measures to use a 2n dividing scheme regardless of exact definitions, and this pattern is seen even with metric measuring spoons

Confusion comes about from teaspoon continuing to be called a "dram" in vernacular, despite the sizes of actual spoons creeping up quietly over time, such that  of a tsp (tsp > fl dr) would in fact become congruent with current  fl dr values for the scruple and saltspoon; in other words, the terminology not keeping pace with the definition. At the small scales involved this is negligible (i.e.: math can convert down to tsp ×10−9, but to what degree can it practically be meted); however can cause problems when accuracy is required such as medicines: "In almost all cases the modern teacups, tablespoons, dessertspoons, and teaspoons, after careful test by the author, were found to average 25 percent greater capacity than the theoretical quantities given above, and thus the use of accurately graduated medicine glasses, which may be had now at a trifling cost, should be insisted upon."

* Discrepancies due to size, generally disregarded as at the scale it becomes a factor, the person generally is using the next size up measuring cup (i.e.: 1 fl oz is likely to be straight measured in an ounce cup and not as 9 (vs 12) teaspoons)

In domestic cooking, bulk solids, notably flour and sugar, are measured by volume, often cups, though they are sold by weight at retail. Weight measures are used for meat. Butter may be measured by either weight ( lb) or volume (3 tbsp) or a combination of weight and volume ( lb plus 3 tbsp); it is sold by weight but in packages marked to facilitate common divisions by eye. (As a sub-packaged unit, a stick of butter, at  lb [113 g], is a de facto measure in the US)

Cookbooks in Canada use the same system, although pints and gallons would be taken as their Imperial quantities unless specified otherwise. Following the adoption of the metric system, recipes in Canada are frequently published with metric conversions.

Approximate units

There are a variety of approximate units of measures, which are frequently undefined by any official source, or which have had conflicting definitions over time, yet which are commonly used. The measurement units that are most commonly understood to be approximate are the drop, smidgen, pinch, and dash, yet nearly all of the traditional cooking measurement units lack statutory definitions, or even any definition by any organization authorized to set standards in the U.S. For example, of the table above, only the fluid ounce, pint, quart, and gallon are officially defined by the NIST. All of the others appear only in conversion guides lacking statutory authority, or in now-obsolete publications of the U.S. Pharmacopeial Convention, or USP—essentially, the Apothecaries' system—which still has authority to define certain drug and supplement standards. The USP has long-since abandoned Apothecaries' measurements, and even now recommends against using teaspoons to measure doses of medicine.

British (Imperial) measures 
Note that measurements in this section are in imperial units.

British imperial measures distinguish between weight and volume.
 Weight is measured in ounces and pounds (avoirdupois) as in the U.S.
 Volume is measured in Imperial gallons, quarts, pints, and fluid ounces. Older recipes may well give measurements in cups; insofar as a standard cup was used, it was usually  pint [≈285 mL] (or sometimes  pint [≈190 mL]), but if the recipe is one that has been handed down in a family, it is just as likely to refer to someone's favourite kitchen cup as to that standard. Please also note British recipe books tend to refer to  pint or 10 fluid ounces, instead of a single cup for volume.

American cooks using British recipes, and vice versa, need to be careful with pints and fluid ounces.
A US pint is 473 mL, while a UK pint is 568 mL, about 20% larger.
This makes an Imperial pint equivalent to 19.2 US fluid ounces.

On a larger scale, perhaps for institutional cookery, an Imperial gallon is eight Imperial pints (160 imp fl oz, 4.546 litres) whereas the US gallon is eight US pints (128 US fl oz, 3.785 litres).

The metric system was officially adopted in the UK, for most purposes, in the 20th century and both imperial and metric are taught in schools and used in books. It is now mandatory for the sale of food to also show metric. However, it is not uncommon to purchase goods which are measured and labeled in metric, but the actual measure is rounded to the equivalent imperial measure (i.e., milk labeled as 568 mL / 1 pint). In September 2007, the EU with Directive 2007/45/EC deregulated prescribed metric packaging of most products, leaving only wines and liqueurs subject to prescribed EU-wide pre-packaging legislation; the law relating to labelling of products remaining unchanged.

Special instructions 
Volume measures of compressible ingredients have a substantial measurement uncertainty, in the case of flour of about 20%. Some volume-based recipes, therefore, attempt to improve the reproducibility by including additional instructions for measuring the correct amount of an ingredient. For example, a recipe might call for "1 cup brown sugar, firmly packed", or "2 heaping cups flour". A few of the more common special measuring methods:

Firmly packed
With a spatula, a spoon, or by hand, the ingredient is pressed as tightly as possible into the measuring device.
Lightly packed
The ingredient is pressed lightly into the measuring device, only tightly enough to ensure no air pockets.
Even / level
A precise measure of an ingredient, discarding all of the ingredient that rises above the rim of the measuring device. Sweeping across the top of the measure with the back of a straight knife or the blade of a spatula is a common leveling method.
Rounded
Allowing a measure of an ingredient to pile up above the rim of the measuring device naturally, into a soft, rounded shape.
Heaping / heaped
The maximum amount of an ingredient which will stay on the measuring device.
Sifted
This instruction may be seen in two different ways, with two different meanings: before the ingredient, as "1 cup sifted flour", indicates the ingredient should be sifted into the measuring device (and normally leveled), while after the ingredient, as "1 cup flour, sifted", denotes the sifting should occur after measurement.

Such special instructions are unnecessary in weight-based recipes.

See also

 Cooking
 Gastronorm sizes (standard sizes of container)
 Gas mark, a system of oven temperatures used in the UK
 Gourmet Library and museum
 Imperial units
 Scoop (utensil), having their own system of measurement
 United States customary units

Notes

References

External links

The Weight of Water from Fourmilab Switzerland
Canadian Weights and Measures Act ( R.S., 1985, c. W-6 )
Australian National Measurement Regulations 1999
UK Weights and Measures Act 1985 (1985 c. 72)
U.S. NIST Guide to SI Units metric conversions → see Appendix B.9
U.S. NIST Household Weights and Measures Chart Abbreviated or rounded figures.

 
Cooking